A list of films produced by the Marathi language film industry based in Maharashtra in the year 2001.

2001 Releases
A list of Marathi films released in 2001.

References

Lists of 2001 films by country or language
 Marathi
2001